The Aerosim Flight Academy, formerly the Delta Connection Academy, a former subsidiary of Delta Air Lines, is a flight school for prospective pilots wishing to enter a career as a commercial airline pilot. As of August 2, 2010, Delta Connection Academy changed names to Aerosim Flight Academy. In 2017, L3 Technologies bought the flight academy under the L3 Commercial Training Solutions branch. It is now L3 CTS Airline Academy. It is headquartered in Sanford, Florida at the Orlando Sanford International Airport. The school has other campuses around the United States.

History
The flight school began in 1987 as Air Line Aviation Academy, founded by a retired Delta captain. In 1989 it was acquired and expanded by Comair Holdings. The school was renamed Comair Aviation Academy, and remained affiliated with its parent airline, Comair, until Delta Air Lines purchased Comair and all of its subsidiaries in January 2000. It was then renamed to match the company's regional airline branding. Pilots who graduate are not limited to Delta Connection airlines, in fact, graduates of the programs have been hired by over 60 different airlines worldwide.

In September 2016, Aerosim Flight Academy was purchased by L-3 Communications and renamed to L3 Airline Academy.

In July 2019, L3 Technologies and Harris Corporation merged to form L3Harris. L3 Airline Academy was once again re-named to its current name: L3Harris Flight Academy

Sale/Merger

On December 31, 2009, Delta Connection Academy, Inc., was partially sold to Flight Training Acquisition LLC (FTA) backed by Lincolnshire Management and GTI Group. Included in this transaction was the acquisition of Aerosim Technologies, Inc. Dave Rapley was appointed CEO of the company.

The flight school retained the "Delta Connection Academy" name until August 2, 2010, when the official announcement came that the school is to now be known simply as "Aerosim Flight Academy".

Campuses
Aerosim Flight Academy is fully accredited by the Accrediting Commission of Career Schools and Colleges (ACCSC). The flight school is located in Sanford, Florida.

References

External links 

 

Educational institutions established in 2000
Aviation schools in Florida
Delta Air Lines
2000 establishments in Florida